Kadambur C. Raju (born 20 Aug 1959) is an Indian politician and the member of Tamil Nadu Legislative Assembly from the Kovilpatti constituency. He represents the All India Anna Dravida Munnetra Kazhagam (AIADMK) party.

Raju won the Kovilpatti seat in the 14th Tamil Nadu Legislative Assembly in the 2011 elections. He was initially deselected from contesting the seat in the 2016 elections, with then AIADMK General Secretary J. Jayalalithaa preferring to let K. Ramanujam Ganesh stand. However, when it was understood that the experienced Vaiko was to stand there for the People's Welfare Front, Jayalalithaa chose to reinstate Raju because he was a more potent electoral force than Ganesh. A few days later, Vaiko announced that he would not contest the constituency. Raju won the seat with 428 more votes than his nearest rival.

Jayalalithaa appointed Raju as Minister for Information and Publicity in May 2016. This was his first cabinet post. Soon after Jayalalithaa died in December 2016, and despite being in the cabinet, Raju rebelled against then Chief Minister O. Panneerselvam. He demanded that V. K. Sasikala should become Chief Minister, arguing that the post and that of party general secretary, which Sasikala held, had always been combined since the party's foundation by M. G. Ramachandran. Although Sasikala did become party leader in early February, and Panneerselvam resigned as Chief Minister, she was not formally appointed to the office at the time of her conviction for criminal offences that effectively thwarted her ambitions.

In April 2017 he was one of three AIADMK ministers against whom police filed a First Information Report after allegations of obstructing officials who were conducting raids related to income tax. He was alleged to have done so at the house of Sarathkumar, the president of All India Samathuva Makkal Katchi.
He recently attended a conference conducted by the Kamma Naidu caste organization in which he was born.

Personal life 
Raju was born on 20 August 1959 in Kovilpatti  He has a D.T.Ed. degree and took early retirement from his job as a teacher. He is married and he has two children.

References 

1959 births
Tamil Nadu MLAs 2011–2016
Tamil Nadu MLAs 2016–2021
Tamil Nadu MLAs 2021–2026
All India Anna Dravida Munnetra Kazhagam politicians
State cabinet ministers of Tamil Nadu
Living people
People from Virudhunagar district